Epipedobates espinosai is a species of frog in the family Dendrobatidae endemic to Ecuador.
Its natural habitats are subtropical or tropical moist lowland forests, rivers, freshwater marshes, and intermittent freshwater marshes.  It is threatened by habitat loss.

References

Epipedobates
Amphibians of Ecuador
Amphibians described in 1956
Taxonomy articles created by Polbot